Amorphognathus is an extinct conodont genus in the family Balognathidae from the Ordovician.

References

External links 

 

Prioniodontida genera
Ordovician conodonts
Paleozoic life of Manitoba
Paleozoic life of the Northwest Territories
Paleozoic life of Nunavut